Th-resa Bostick (born 1969) is an American professional female bodybuilder.

Bodybuilding career

Amateur
At the 1999 NPC USA Championships, Bostick won the heavyweight class and overall and thus won her IFBB pro card.

Professional
Bostick won the heavyweight class during her pro-debut at the 2000 IFBB Jan Tana Classic.

Contest history

 1991 NPC Extravaganza - 6th (HW)
 1993 NPC Ohio South District - 1st (HW)
 1995 NPC Battle of Championship - 1st (HW and overall)
 1995 NPC Nationals - 3rd (HW)
 1996 NPC Nationals - 9th (HW)
 1998 NPC Nationals - 9th (HW)
 1998 IFBB North American Championships - 5th (HW)
 1999 Jan Tana Amateur Grand Prix - 1st (HW and overall)
 1999 NPC USA Championships - 1st (HW and overall)
 2000 IFBB Jan Tana Pro Classic - 1st (HW)
 2000 IFBB Ms. Olympia - 7th (HW)
 2001 IFBB Ms. International - 9th (HW)
 2007 IFBB Europa Supershow - 2nd (HW)

References

1969 births
African-American female bodybuilders
Living people
Professional bodybuilders
Sportspeople from Birmingham, Alabama
Sportspeople from Boynton Beach, Florida
Sportspeople from Fairfax County, Virginia
Sportspeople from Palm Beach, Florida
21st-century African-American people
21st-century African-American women
20th-century African-American sportspeople
20th-century African-American women
20th-century African-American people